Ryder Center for Health and Physical Education is an athletics and recreational complex located on the campus of Saginaw Valley State University in University Center, Michigan, United States. It was built in 1985 and is home to SVSU Cardinals sports teams.

The Ryder Center includes:
The Fieldhouse is a premiere facility offering an 85-yard football field with field turf surface, 300-meter indoor track with timing booth for all indoor track meets and four full batting cages for baseball & softball training. The fieldhouse is connected to all other amenities of the Ryder Center and is the second facility of its kind at the NCAA Division II level.
Campus Recreation Center/Fitness Center The Fitness Center encompasses over 63,000 sq. ft. offering fitness machines, free weights, walking/running track, and three basketball courts. In addition, racquetball courts, practice fields, a dance studio and other multi-use rooms are available at the Ryder Center.
 James E. O'Neill Arena, the flagship facility of the complex and a 3,932-seat indoor arena used for basketball; it can seat up to 4,932 for concerts and features  of space.
 O’Neill Arena Indoor Track & Field, 
    Seating Capacity: 531
    Dimensions: 60,970 sq ft.
    Features:
    6-lane, 200 meter indoor track
    8-lane, 100 meter straight away
    Voice quality public address sound system
    1 long jump pit
    1 pole vault pit
 Gerstacker Regional Aquatic Center,  The premiere aquatic center of the Great Lakes Bay Region featuring an eight-lane, 50-meter pool with two 1-meter boards and a 3-meter board and a Daktronics timing system with full-color message board.

The Center is also used for conventions and trade shows.

Outdoor facilities include Wickes Stadium, ten tennis courts, a 384-seat baseball field, a 384-seat softball field and a 270-seat soccer field.

External links
Center

Sports venues in Michigan
College basketball venues in the United States
Convention centers in Michigan
Indoor arenas in Michigan
Saginaw Valley State University
Sports venues completed in 1985
1985 establishments in Michigan